Capture of Menorca may refer to:

 Capture of Menorca (1708)
 Capture of Menorca (1798)